Ticlla or Qutuni (Aymara qutu heap, pile, -ni a suffix to indicate ownership, "the one with a heap", Hispanicized spellings Cotoni, Cutuni), also called Tiklla (Quechua for eyelash; two-colored, Hispanicized spellings Ticcla, Ticlla) or Tiqlla (Quechua for 'with alternating colors'), is a  mountain in the Cordillera Central in the Andes of Peru. Strictly speaking the popular name Ticlla refers to a group of peaks of the Qutuni-Ticlla cirque. The highest mountain of the massif is named Qutuni. It lies in a sub-range of the Cordillera Central named Pichqa Waqra (Quechua for "five horns", also spelled Pichcahuajra).

It is located in the Lima Region, Yauyos Province, on the border of the districts Ayaviri, Miraflores and Tanta. It lies on the southern border of the Nor Yauyos-Cochas Landscape Reserve. Ticlla is situated southeast Aqupallqa and the lake named Tikllaqucha, northeast of Wayna Qutuni ("young Qutuni") and north of  Llunk'uti and the lake named Wask'aqucha. One of the nearest villages is Qutuni (Cutuni), situated west of the mountain.

References

Mountains of Peru
Mountains of Lima Region